Megapitaria is a genus of bivalves belonging to the family Veneridae.

The species of this genus are found in America.

Species:

Megapitaria aurantiaca 
Megapitaria maculata 
Megapitaria squalida

References

Veneridae
Bivalve genera